The 1940 Clemson Tigers football team was an American football team that represented Clemson College in the Southern Conference during the 1940 college football season. In their first season under head coach Frank Howard, the Tigers compiled a 6–2–1 record (4–0 against conference opponents), won the Southern Conference championship, and outscored opponents by a total of 182 to 73.

Red Sharpe was the team captain. The team's statistical leaders included tailback Chippy Maness with 388 passing yards and 472 rushing yards and wingback Aubrey Rion with 28 points scored (4 touchdowns, 4 extra points).

Three Clemson players were selected as first-team players on the 1940 All-Southern Conference football team: end Joe Blalock; tackle George Fritts; and back Charlie Timmons.

Schedule

References

Clemson
Southern Conference football champion seasons
Clemson Tigers football seasons
Clemson Tigers football